is a railway station operated by JR West on the Gantoku Line in Shūnan, Yamaguchi. It is located in the Kumage part of Shūnan, and the Kumage District Shūnan City Branch Office is nearby.

History

March 28, 1934: Station opens
April 1, 1987: Station operation is taken over by JR West after privatization of Japanese National Railways

Layout
The station has two tracks, with two side platforms on either side of the station, connected by an overpass at the south end of the station. On the platform for trains bound for Iwakuni, there is a statue of a hooded crane.

Platforms

Adjacent stations
West Japan Railway (JR West)

See also
 List of railway stations in Japan

External links

  
 Shūnan City website 

Railway stations in Japan opened in 1934
Railway stations in Yamaguchi Prefecture
Shūnan, Yamaguchi